José-María Larrabeiti Eguidazu (born 20 October 1900, date of death unknown) was a Spanish sprinter. He competed in three events at the 1924 Summer Olympics.

References

External links
 

1900 births
Year of death missing
Athletes (track and field) at the 1924 Summer Olympics
Spanish male sprinters
Olympic athletes of Spain
Sportspeople from Bilbao
Sportspeople from Santander, Spain
Athletes from the Basque Country (autonomous community)
20th-century Spanish people